Pachinko is the second novel by Harlem-based author and journalist Min Jin Lee. Published in 2017, Pachinko is an epic historical fiction novel following a Korean family who immigrates to Japan. The character-driven story features an ensemble of characters who encounter racism, discrimination, stereotyping, and other aspects of the 20th-century Korean experience of Japan.

Pachinko was a 2017 finalist for the National Book Award for Fiction. Apple Inc.'s streaming service Apple TV+ produced a television adaptation of the novel and it was released in March 2022.

Plot 

The novel takes place over the course of three sections, which begin with quotations from the works of Charles Dickens, Park Wan-suh, and Benedict Anderson, respectively.  

Book I, Gohyang/Hometown, begins with the story of Sunja's father, Hoonie, and ends with Noa's birth.
Book II, Motherland, begins with Baek Isak's incarceration and ends with Sunja's search of Koh Hansu.
Book III, Pachinko, begins with Noa's new beginnings in Nagano and ends with Sunja's reflections upon everything that has happened to her.

Book I (1910–1933): Gohyang/Hometown 
In 1883, in the little island fishing village of Yeongdo, which is a ferry ride from Busan, an aging fisherman and his wife take in lodgers to make a little more money. They have three sons, but only one, Hoonie, who has a cleft lip and twisted foot, survives to adulthood. Because of his deformities, Hoonie is considered ineligible for marriage. When he is 27, Japan annexes Korea, and many families are left destitute and without food. Due to their prudent habits, Hoonie's family's situation is comparatively more stable, and a matchmaker arranges a marriage between Hoonie and Yangjin, the daughter of a poor farmer who had lost everything in the colonial conquest. Hoonie and Yangjin take over the lodging house upon the passing of Hoonie's parents.

In the mid-1910s, Yangjin and Hoonie have a daughter named Sunja. After her thirteenth birthday, she is raised by her mother Yangjin, her father Hoonie having died from tuberculosis. At age sixteen, Sunja is pursued by a wealthy fishbroker named Koh Hansu. However, she shows little interest in him until he saves her from an attempted assault by three teenagers on her way home from the market, leading her to start trusting him. From that point on, Hansu spends weeks secretly meeting with her and sharing his stories of Osaka with her. After weeks of meeting her, Hansu goes with Sunja into the forest and sexually assaults her. That day marks the beginning of their affair, where Hansu repeatedly uses her for her body and Sunja is continuously assaulted without realizing it, as she believes they are meant to be married. Sunja becomes pregnant, after which Hansu reveals that he is already married but intends to keep her as his mistress. Ashamed, Sunja refuses to be his mistress and ends their relationship. Her mother finds out Sunja is pregnant, but Sunja keeps the father's identity a secret. Yangjin discusses the matter with one of their lodgers, a Christian minister suffering from tuberculosis who she has been caring for since his arrival at her boardinghouse months prior. Baek Isak, the minister, believes he will die soon due to his many illnesses, and decides to marry Sunja to give her child a name and to give meaning to his life, as he believes that it is a sign from God to take care of Sunja and her future child. Sunja agrees to the plan, marries Isak, and travels with him to Osaka to live with Isak's brother and his wife. In Osaka, Sunja is shocked to learn that Koreans are treated poorly: most are forced to live in a small ghetto and are only hired for menial jobs. Sunja's brother-in-law, Yoseb, insists on supporting the entire household on his own salary, but Sunja and her sister-in-law Kyunghee come to learn he is in heavy debt due to paying for Sunja and Isak's passage to Osaka. To repay the debtors, a pregnant Sunja sells a watch Hansu had given her in Yeongdo. Yoseb becomes furious that the women took agency over their lives and spends the whole night away. Meanwhile, Sunja gives birth to a son, Noa.

Book II (1939–1962) 
The novel jumps in time, and in Book II, Sunja raises her two children, Noa (Hansu's son), and Mozasu (Isak's son). While Noa resembles Hansu in appearance, he is similar in personality to Isak, and he seeks a quiet life of learning, reading, and academia. Shortly after Mozasu is born, a member of Isak's church is caught reciting the Lord's Prayer when they were supposed to be worshiping the emperor, and Isak is sent to prison. Despite Yoseb's resistance, Sunja begins to work in the market, selling kimchi that she and Kyunghee make at home. Their small business is profitable, but as Japan enters World War II and ingredients grow scarce, they struggle to make money. Sunja is eventually approached by the owner of a restaurant, Kim Changho, who pays her and Kyunghee to make kimchi in his restaurant daily, providing them with financial security. A dying Isak is eventually released from prison, and he is able to briefly reunite with his family before dying.

A few years later, on the eve of the restaurant's closure, Sunja is approached by Hansu, who reveals that he is the actual owner of the restaurant and has been manipulating her family for years, having tracked Sunja down after she sold her watch. He arranges for her to spend the rest of the war in the countryside with Kyunghee and her children and for Yoseb to wait the rest of the war out working at a factory in Nagasaki. During her time at the farm, Hansu also reunites Sunja with her mother, Yangjin, and eventually returns a permanently crippled Yoseb to the family after he is horrifically burned during the bombings. 

The Baek family return to Osaka where Noa and Mozasu resume their studies. The family continues to struggle in spite of Hansu's help. Though they long to return to the North of Korea, where Kyunghee has family, Hansu warns them not to. Noa succeeds in passing the entrance exams for Waseda University. Despite Sunja's resistance, Hansu pays for Noa's entire university education, pretending it is simply because as an older Korean man he feels responsible for helping the younger generation. Meanwhile, Mozasu drops out of school and goes to work for Goro, a man who runs pachinko parlors. Mozasu meets and falls in love with a Korean seamstress, Yumi, who dreams of moving to the United States. The two marry and have a son, Solomon. Yumi later dies in a car accident, leaving Mozasu to raise their son on his own. Noa, who has continued his studies and looks up to Hansu as a mentor, accidentally discovers that Hansu is his father, and he learns of his ties to the yakuza. Ashamed of his true heritage and of being linked to corrupt blood, he drops out of university and disowns his family.

Book III (1962–1989) 
Noa moves to Nagano, intending to work off his debt to Hansu and rid himself of his shameful heritage. He becomes a bookkeeper for a racist pachinko owner who won't hire Koreans and lives undercover using his Japanese name, Nobuo, marrying a Japanese woman and having four children. After having abandoned his birth family and living sixteen years under a false identity, Noa is tracked down by Hansu at the request of Sunja. Though Hansu warns Sunja not to immediately approach Noa, Sunja refuses to listen to his warnings and begs Noa to reunite with her and the rest of the family. Noa promises to call, and he commits suicide shortly after Sunja leaves. 

In the meantime, Mozasu has become extremely wealthy, owning his own pachinko parlors and dating a Japanese divorcee, Etsuko, who refuses to marry him. Hana, Etsuko's troubled teenage daughter from her previous marriage, arrives to stay with her mother after learning she is pregnant, and later she has an abortion. Hana is drawn to Solomon's innocence and they begin a sexual relationship.  He quickly falls in love with her, giving her large sums of money which she uses to run away to Tokyo.

Years later, Solomon, now attending college in New York City and dating a Korean-American woman named Phoebe, receives a call from a drunken Hana in Roppongi. He relays the information to Etsuko and Mozasu, who manage to locate her. After graduating from Columbia University, Solomon takes a job at a British bank and moves back to Japan with Phoebe. His first major client project involves convincing an elderly Korean woman to sell her land in order to clear the way for the construction of a golf resort, which he accomplishes by calling in a favor from his father's friend Goro. When the woman dies of natural causes soon afterwards, Solomon's employers claim that the deal will attract negative publicity and they fire him, citing his father's connections to pachinko and implying that the woman was murdered.

With newfound resolve and a clearer outlook on life, Solomon breaks up with Phoebe, goes to work for his father's business, and makes amends with a dying Hana in the hospital. Now an elderly woman, Sunja visits Isak's grave and reflects on her life. She learns from the cemetery groundskeeper that despite the shame Noa felt for his family, Noa had regularly visited Isak's grave even after moving to Nagano. This gives Sunja the closure and reassurance she needs, and she buries a photo of Noa beside Isak's grave.

Characters 
Hoonie — Hoonie is the first character to be introduced in the story, born with a twisted foot and a cleft palate. He meets his wife, Yangjin, on his wedding day, and they have three children who die young before Sunja, their only surviving daughter, is born. Hoonie dies of tuberculosis when Sunja is thirteen years old.

Sunja — Sunja is the main protagonist of Pachinko, appearing throughout the novel. Sunja is the daughter of Hoonie and Yangjin, born in Yeongdo, Busan, Korea. Sunja has two children. Her first born, Noa, is fathered by Koh Hansu, and her second born, Mozasu, is fathered by Baek Isak.

Baek Isak — Baek Isak is a Protestant minister from Pyongyang, Korea. He is first introduced when he visits Yangjin's boardinghouse on his way to Osaka to move in with his brother, Yoseb. Sickly since birth, Baek Isak struggles with sickness until his death in Osaka.

Kyunghee — Kyunghee is Yoseb's wife and Sunja's best friend and sister-in-law. She plays a large part in helping Sunja support their families in living, helping Sunja prepare kimchi to sell.

Yoseb — Yoseb is Baek Isak's brother who lives in Osaka, Japan. He works in a factory to support his family. He lives in Ikaino in Osaka, where most Koreans in Osaka are known to live. He receives a job opportunity in Nagasaki in 1945. He becomes very injured in the subsequent bombing of Nagasaki.

Koh Hansu — Koh Hansu is a Korean man who was adopted into a family of organized crime in Japan. Using his connections, Koh Hansu continually strives to earn money and control what he can. Hansu meets Sunja in Korea, even though he has a wife in Japan. Throughout the novel, Hansu utilizes his influence to look after Sunja and her family, keeping them alive. Hansu is driven by his love for his only son, Noa.

Noa — Noa is the only son of Koh Hansu and Sunja. He attends Waseda University in Tokyo before moving to Nagano to start a new life away from Hansu and Sunja. He struggles with identity issues stemming from his biological father's associations with the yakuza.

Mozasu — Mozasu is the only son of Baek Isak and Sunja. He faces constant bullying in school and tends to retaliate with force. As a result, he drops out of school and begins an apprenticeship at a pachinko parlor as a guard. Eventually, he moves up in the ranks and establishes his own parlors. Mozasu marries a girl named Yumi and has one son, Solomon.

Solomon — Solomon is the only son of Mozasu and Yumi. Growing up, Solomon does not face many of the same issues as his father or grandmother, since his father is very wealthy. Torn about what he wants to do with his life, he visits the United States and eventually decides that he wants to enter the pachinko business like his father.

Themes 
Themes in Pachinko include discrimination, stereotypes, and power, particularly in the context of the experiences of Koreans in Japan during World War II. The novel also highlights the motif of the game pachinko, and the unpredictable and uncontrollable nature of the game is a metaphor for the characters' stories. Lee has said that the novel's title, which was originally set to be Motherland, was changed to Pachinko when, in her interviews, Koreans seemed to relate back to the pachinko business.

Style 
The novel has been compared to the works of John Galsworthy and Charles Dickens.

Historical context 
Pachinko takes place between the years of 1910 and 1989, a period that includes both the Japanese occupation of Korea and World War II. As a historical novel, these events play a central role in Pachinko, influencing many of the characters' decisions.

In an interview, Lee noted that the history of Korean-Japanese people demonstrates "exclusion and otherization".

Reception and awards
The book, a New York Times Best Seller, received strong reviews, including those from The New York Times, The Guardian, NPR, The Sydney Morning Herald, The Irish Times, and Kirkus Reviews and is on the "Best Fiction of 2017" lists from Esquire, Chicago Review of Books, Amazon.com, Entertainment Weekly, the BBC, The Guardian, and Book Riot. In a Washington Post interview, writer Roxane Gay called Pachinko her favorite book of 2017. The book was named by The New York Times as one of the 10 Best Books of 2017.

Pachinko was a 2017 finalist for the National Book Award for Fiction.

Television adaptation

In August 2018, it was announced that Apple Inc. had obtained the screen rights to the novel for development as a television series for Apple TV+. The show is expected to be produced by production company Media Res with Soo Hugh serving as showrunner, writer, and executive producer; In October 2020, the series' directors and main cast were announced: South Korean filmmaker Kogonada directed four episodes, including the pilot, and served as an executive producer of the series. Justin Chon also directed four episodes. The cast includes Youn Yuh-jung, Lee Min-ho, Jin Ha, Anna Sawai, Minha Kim, Soji Arai, and Kaho Minami. It was released on March 25, 2022.

See also
 Korean diaspora
 Koreans in Japan
 Koreans in New York City
 Koreatown, Manhattan (맨해튼 코리아타운)
 Korean journalists in New York City

References 

2017 American novels
American historical novels
Family saga novels
Incest in fiction
Novels about immigration
Novels set in Japan
Novels set in Korea
Refugees and displaced people in fiction
Novels set in the Joseon dynasty
Japan in non-Japanese culture
Zainichi Korean culture
Grand Central Publishing books